Johnny Alberto Rios Torres (born 14 March 1985) is a former Colombian professional footballer who last played as a centre back.

Club career

Dragón
In 2013, Ríos signed with Dragón of El Salvador.

Águila
In 2015, Ríos signed with Águila.

Juventud Independiente
Ríos signed with Juventud Independiente for the Clausura 2016 tournament.

Luis Ángel Firpo
Luis Ángel Firpo bought the category from Juventud Independiente to play in the Primera División. Once the administrative processes were carried out, Ríos went on to play with Luis Ángel Firpo.

Municipal Limeño
Ríos signed with Municipal Limeño for the Apertura 2018 tournament.

References

1985 births
Living people
Colombian footballers
Colombia international footballers
Liga Panameña de Fútbol players
Categoría Primera A players
Categoría Primera B players
América de Cali footballers
Unión Magdalena footballers
Patriotas Boyacá footballers
Tigres F.C. footballers
Tauro F.C. players
La Equidad footballers
Atlético F.C. footballers
C.D. Dragón footballers
C.D. Águila footballers
C.D. Juventud Independiente players
C.D. Luis Ángel Firpo footballers
A.D. Isidro Metapán footballers
Colombian expatriate footballers
Expatriate footballers in Panama
Expatriate footballers in El Salvador
Association football defenders